Mose, Mosè, or Mosé is a given name which may refer to:

People

In religion
 Mose Durst, former president of the Unification Church of the United States
 Mosé Higuera, Colombian Catholic bishop
 Mosè Tovini, Italian Roman Catholic priest

In music
 Mose Allison, American jazz pianist and singer
 Mose Christensen, American musician, founder and conductor of the Oregon Symphony
 Mose Rager, guitar player from Kentucky
 Mose Vinson (1917–2002), American pianist and singer

In visual art
 Mosè Bianchi, Italian painter and printmaker
 Mose Tolliver, American painter
 Mosè Turri, Italian painter

In sports
 Mosé Arosio, Italian racing cyclist
 Mose Bashaw, NFL player
 Mose Frazier (born 1993), American former football player
 Mose Lantz, NFL player
 Mosé Navarra, former tennis player from Italy
 Mose Solomon, the "Rabbi of Swat", American Major League Baseball player
 Mose Tuiali'i, rugby union player

In other fields
 Mose (Ancient Egyptian official), 13th-century BCE Egyptian official under Ramesses II
 Mose (scribe), 13th-century BCE Egyptian scribe under Ramesses II
 Mosè Giacomo Bertoni, Swiss naturalist who studied Paraguayan plants
 Mosè de Brolo (Moses of Bergamo), 12th-century Italian poet and translator
 Mose Gingerich, Amish-born American documentary maker
 Mose Humphrey, American firefighter
 Mose Jefferson, American politician
 Mose Khoneli, 12th-century Georgian writer and poet
 Mosè Piccio, 16th-century Ottoman lexicographer
 Mose Penaani Tjitendero, Namibian politician and educator
 Mose Wright, uncle of Emmett Till who was a witness at the murder trial

Fictional characters
 Mose the Fireboy, prototypical representation of a b'hoy in 19th-century American theatre
 Mose Jakande, a Nigerian-French mercenary in the film Furious 7
 Mose Manuel, a recurring character on the HBO series Deadwood
 Mose Schrute, a character from the American adaptation of the TV series The Office

See also
 MOSE, a Venetian engineering project 
 Moze (disambiguation)